Allied Air is a cargo airline based in Lagos, Nigeria. It operates scheduled and charter services in Nigeria and throughout Africa. Its main base is Murtala Mohammed International Airport, Lagos.

History
The airline was established in 1998. The Nigerian Civil Aviation Authority (NCAA) set a deadline of April 30, 2007 for all airlines operating in the country to re-capitalise or be grounded. Allied Air successfully re-capitalised and was registered for operation.

Destinations
Key scheduled destinations include Accra, Freetown, Monrovia, Entebbe, and Malabo. It also has regular services to Liege.

Fleet

The Allied Air fleet consists of the following aircraft (as of February 2021):

The airline used to operate Boeing 727-200Fs and one was written off in an accident on June 2, 2012.

Accidents and incidents
On June 2, 2012, a Boeing 727-200F, operating flight Allied Air Flight 111, overshot the runway as it landed at Kotoka International Airport in the Ghanaian city of Accra after flying from Lagos, Nigeria. The plane continued through the airport boundary fence and across a main road, hitting a minivan. 10 people in the minivan were killed outright. The plane's four crew suffered minor injuries.

External links
Allied Air

References

Airlines of Nigeria
Airlines established in 1998
Cargo airlines
Companies based in Lagos
Nigerian companies established in 1998